Lake Horea is a natural salt lake in the town of Ocna Sibiului, Sibiu County, in the historical Transylvania region of Romania. It is one of the many lakes of the Ocna Sibiului mine, a large salt mine which has one of the largest salt reserves in Romania. It is one of the three lakes of the mine's strand, the other ones being Lake Crișan and Lake Cloșca.

Name 
The lake was named after Vasile Ursu Nicola, commonly known as Horea, who was a Transylvanian Romanian leader of the Revolt of Horea, Cloșca and Crișan in 1784-85.

History 
Lakes Horea, Cloșca, and Crișan were formed by the flood of six non-certified salines. Other lakes were mentioned in their place in 1770.

Information
Maximum depth: 
Salinity: 69-330 g/l
Fauna: Artemia salina

Lakes of the salt mine 
 Auster 
 Lake Avram Iancu-Ocniţa
 Balta cu Nămol 
 Brâncoveanu 
 Cloşca 
 Crişan
 Lacul Fără Fund 
 Gura Minei 
 Horea 
 Mâţelor 
 Negru
 Pânzelor 
 Rândunica 
 Verde (Freshwater lake)
 Vrăjitoarelor (Freshwater lake)

References 

Lakes of Sibiu County